Andhra Pradesh Power Generation Corporation Limited is power generating organization in Andhra Pradesh. It undertakes operation and maintenance of the power plants and also setting up new power projects alongside upgrading the project's capacity. Under the recommendations of Hittenbhayya committee setup by TDP Govt..

History

The government reforms in power sector led to the formation of APGENCO on 28 December 1998 and commenced operations from 1 February 1999. The imbalance of the revenues against the cost of production, no significant reduction in technical losses and energy thefts, high cost purchases from IPP's, other SEB's gradually worsened the financial position of APSEB.

APSEB division 

Government of Andhra Pradesh realizing the declining tendency of the financial position of APSEB and considering the recommendations made by committee it was unbundled into Andhra Pradesh Power Generation Corporation (APGENCO) & Transmission Corporation of Andhra Pradesh Limited (APTRANSCO) on 1 February 1999 by AP Electricity REFORMS ACT.

APTRANSCO was further unbundled w.e.f. 1 April 2000 into "Transmission Corporation" and four "Distribution Companies" (DISCOMS). From Feb 1999 to June 2005 APTransco remained as single buyer in purchasing and selling of power to DISCOMs.

APGENCO formation and split 

Later, on 2 June 2014, when the state was bifurcated, APGENCO distributed all the assets, liabilities and power stations to both the states and Telangana Genco (TSGENCO) was formed for the newly formed Telangana state and APGENCO remained for Andhra Pradesh in accordance with the Andhra Pradesh Reorganisation Act, 2014.

Power plants 
The total installed capacity of APGENCO, after the formation of TSGenCo is 4559.6 MW comprising 2810 MW Thermal, 1747.6 MW Hydro and 2 MW Wind power stations. The Power Plants of APGENCO include thermal, hydel and wind based plants.

Thermal projects

Note: Simhadri Super Thermal plant (4x500 MW) and Damoadaram Sanjeevaiah Thermal Plant (3x800 MW) are not considered as they are not under the ownership of APGENCO.

Hydel projects 

Hydel projects (under construction)

Non-conventional units

Source: Power Stations of AP after bifurcation into APGENCO and TGGENCO

Operational performance

Though the performance of APGenCo thermal power stations in terms of reliability, availability and maintainability (RAM analysis) is one of the best in India, its hydro power stations performance is satisfactory.monsoon season. The thermal efficiency (heat rate) of thermal power stations is quite remarkable. Operating the thermal power stations in the range of 75 to 100% capacity in 'frequency follow mode' with good part load efficiency is the needful strategy in surplus electricity grid except during peak demand hours. Also Hydro power stations should perform well meeting all the functions such as power factor correction, peaking power generation, pumping water in pump mode and secondary power generation during monsoon season utilising total available water. This can be achieved by maintaining hydro power stations at availability more than 95%.

See also

 List of hydroelectric power station failures
 Power sector of Andhra Pradesh
 APTransCo
 Electricity sector in India
 Energy policy of India
 Load following power plant
 Levelised energy cost
 Energy returned on energy invested
 Coal slurry pipeline
 Grid parity
 Net metering
 Negawatt power
 Index of solar energy articles
 Solar power in India
 Wind power in India
 Torrefaction
 Central Electricity Authority
 Economics of new nuclear power plants
 Availability-based tariff
 Demand response
 National Grid (Great Britain)
 Spark spread
 Electricity market
 Electricity Act (2003)

References 

Electric-generation companies of India
Energy in Andhra Pradesh
Hydroelectric power companies of India
State electricity agencies of India
Energy companies established in 1998
1998 establishments in Andhra Pradesh
State agencies of Andhra Pradesh
Organisations based in Vijayawada
Industries in Vijayawada
Companies based in Vijayawada
Indian companies established in 1998